Neil Swain (born 4 September 1971, in Pontypridd) is a Welsh professional super fly/bantam/super bantam/featherweight boxer of the 1990s who won the Commonwealth super bantamweight title, and was a challenger for the British Boxing Board of Control (BBBofC) British super bantamweight title against Michael Brodie, his professional fighting weight varied from , i.e. super flyweight to , i.e. featherweight. Neil Swain is a Welsh Boxing Hall of Fame Inductee. Neil Swain was managed by Dai Gardner

References

External links

Image - Neil Swain
Article - Neil Swain

1971 births
Bantamweight boxers
Featherweight boxers
Living people
Sportspeople from Pontypridd
Super-bantamweight boxers
Super-flyweight boxers
Welsh male boxers